Vlado Bučkovski (born 2 December 1962) is a former prime minister of the Republic of Macedonia, elected by parliament on 17 December 2004. He was previously the defense minister of Macedonia from May 2001 to November 2001 and from November 2002 to December 2004. He was president of the Social Democratic Union of Macedonia. After the 2006 election defeat by the centre-right VMRO-DPMNE, Radmila Šekerinska took over the party's leadership.

On 9 December 2008, Bučkovski was found guilty of abuse of power while serving as defence minister during an armed conflict in 2001 and sentenced to three and a half years in jail.

Early life 

Vlado Bučkovski was born on December 2, 1962, in Skopje, Republic Of Macedonia 

Bučkovski graduated from the Faculty of Law in Skopje in 1986, while he took his M.A. degree in 1992 at the Faculty of Law in Skopje. He took his Ph.D. degree at the Faculty of Law in Skopje in 1998, on topic "Roman and Contemporary Law of Obligations".

Working and political experience 

From 1987 to 1988 Bučkovski worked as an expert collaborator in the Parliament of the Republic of Macedonia, then part of Yugoslavia. In the period from 1988 to 2002 he worked as a lecturer, collaborator, junior assistant and as an assistant at the Faculty of Law in Skopje, while in 2003 he worked as an associate professor at the same faculty.
 
In the period from 1998 to 2000 Bučkovski was a member of the State Election Commission; while in 2000-2001 he was a Chairman of Skopje City Council. In the period from May 13 until November 26, 2001 he performed the function of a Minister of Defense in the wide coalition Government. From November 1, 2002 until December 2004, Bučkovski again served as Minister of Defense. 

Bučkovski became a Chairman of the Government's Legal Council on September 15, 2003. He was elected SDSM Leader on November 26, 2004. On the same day, he was assigned a mandate for a composition of a new Government, following the resignation of former Prime Minister Hari Kostov. He served as prime minister until after the 2006 parliamentary elections, in which his party had a disappointing performance and a new government took office.

Scandal
Sobranie delegates belonging to parties in Macedonia's centre-right ruling coalition voted on August 20, 2007 to strip former premier Bučkovski of his immunity from prosecution. That left him liable to being arrested on charges of involvement in an arms procurement deal costing the country 2.5 million euros (3.18 million U.S. dollars).

Prosecution said he had allegedly benefited from conspiring in 2001 with former Macedonian army chief of staff, General Metodi Stamboliski in buying and selling off spare parts for the army's Russian-made T-55 tanks. Stamboliski was arrested in late July 2007, charged with embezzling 1.8 million Euros (about US $2.5 million) and released on bail.

Conviction
On December 9, 2008 Bučkovski was found guilty of illegally purchasing excessive quantities of tank parts during the armed conflict in 2001 by Judge Vangelica and sentenced to three and a half years in jail. Former army chief of staff Metodi Stamboliski was jailed for three and a half years, and two defense ministry officials and the manager of a state-owned metal company Aco Gjurcevski, Nelko Menkinovski and Mitre Petkovski were sentenced to 3 years. Bučkovski called the verdict "scandalous" and said that he would appeal. He also said "We have proved that we are innocent and sorry that Macedonia and the court didn't use this opportunity to show its independence".

References

 

1962 births
Living people
Politicians from Skopje
Defence ministers of North Macedonia
Prime Ministers of North Macedonia
Social Democratic Union of Macedonia politicians
Ss. Cyril and Methodius University of Skopje alumni
Macedonian lawyers
Heads of government who were later imprisoned